Shane Richardson is the general manager of football of the Australian National Rugby League team, the South Sydney Rabbitohs. Richardson rejoined the club in his current role in 2016 from the NRL, where he had served as the head of game strategy and development. 

Richardson had previously served as the Chief Executive Officer of the Rabbitohs from July 2004 until March 2015, with his administration culminating in the Rabbitohs’ 21st premiership in 2014.

Richardson attended Corinda State High School, Queensland.

Richardson was featured on Brisbane Tigers podcast show called League & More with John Devine, featured prominently on the Brisbane Firehawks NRL expansion bid, it is on TigerTV website https://tigertvnet/.

References

South Sydney Rabbitohs
Living people
Year of birth missing (living people)
Businesspeople from Sydney
Rugby league chairmen and investors
Australian chief executives
Australian rugby league administrators